Susan Aglukark,  (Inuktitut syllabics: ᓲᓴᓐ ᐊᒡᓘᒃᑲᖅ suusan agluukkaq), (born 27 January 1967) is a Canadian singer whose blend of Inuit folk music traditions with country and pop songwriting has made her a major recording star in Canada. Her most successful song/single is "O Siem", which reached No. 1 on the Canadian country and adult contemporary charts in 1995. Overall, she has released seven studio albums and has won three Juno Awards.

Biography

Early life
Aglukark was born in Churchill, Manitoba and raised in Arviat, Northwest Territories (now in Nunavut). She endured sexual abuse as a child and has been vocal about this issue in some of the first nations in Northern Ontario. After graduating from high school, she worked in Ottawa, Ontario as a linguist with the Department of Indian & Northern Affairs, and then returned to the Northwest Territories to work as an executive assistant with the Inuit Tapirisat of Canada.

Career
While working with the Inuit Tapirisat, she began to perform as a singer, and quickly became a popular performer in Inuit communities. She soon attracted the attention of the Canadian Broadcasting Corporation, who included her in a compilation of Arctic performers. In 1992, she released an independent album, Arctic Rose. The following year, she signed to a major record label, releasing an album of Christmas music that year.

Aglukark has also acted as spokesperson for several non-profit groups working with aboriginal and Inuit youth, notably through her writing workshops for Attawapiskat First Nation youth and her involvement in Northern Canada's food crisis. However, she has said that while she is proud to be a role model for aboriginal people in Canada, she ultimately sees herself as an artist with a universal message of self-respect and strength to which she hopes that people of all cultural backgrounds can relate.

This Child
This Child, released in 1995, became her breakthrough album. The first single from that album, "O Siem", went to number one on the Canadian adult contemporary and country charts that year, making Aglukark the first Inuk performer to have a Top 40 hit. "Hina Na Ho (Celebration)" and "Breakin' Down" became hit singles as well. The album was eventually certified triple platinum (300,000 copies sold) in Canada.

Unsung Heroes
In 2000, Aglukark released Unsung Heroes, which spawned another pop hit with "One Turn Deserves Another." This album also included "Turn of the Century," a song about the creation of Nunavut. In 2004, she released Big Feeling.

She sometimes deals with painful subjects in her songs. "Kathy" is about her niece who died by suicide, and "Still Running" is about the trauma of sexual abuse. Aglukark has also recorded a version of "Amazing Grace" in Inuktitut.

Her song "Never Be the Same" was featured on Dawson's Creek in Episode No. 3–14 ("Valentine's Day Massacre"), as well as her song "One Turn Deserves Another" in Episode No. 3–15 ("Crime And Punishment").

Aglukark's second holiday album, Dreaming of Home, was released on 5 November 2013.

She currently resides in Oakville, Ontario.

Awards and recognition 
In 2004, Aglukark was awarded an honorary DFA from the University of Lethbridge.  She was named an officer of the Order of Canada in 2005, and in the same year received an honorary LL.D. degree from the University of Alberta. In the summer of 2006, she performed nightly in the evening grandstand show at the Calgary Stampede.

 1995: winner, Juno Awards for Best New Solo Artist and Best Music of Aboriginal Canada Recording, Arctic Rose
 1996: nominee, Juno Awards for Best Female Vocalist, Best Album (This Child), Single of the Year ("O Siem"), Best Music of Aboriginal Canada Recording (This Child), Best Video ("O Siem")
 2001: nominee, Juno Award for Best Music of Aboriginal Canada Recording, Unsung Heroes
 2004: winner, Juno Award for Aboriginal Recording, Big Feeling
 2004: appointed Officer of the Order of Canada
 2007: nominee, Juno Award for Aboriginal Recording of the Year, Blood Red Earth
 2008: appointed as Distinguished Scholar in Residence at the University of Alberta
 2016: Governor General's Performing Arts Awards - Lifetime Artistic Achievement
The book Aboriginal Carol (2007, Red Deer Press), by David Bouchard, illustrated by Moses Beaver, bilingual (English & Inuktitut), translation and music by Susan Aglukark, was awarded a White Raven by the International Youth Library

Discography

Albums

Singles

Books 
Aglukark is the author of a series of historically based picture books, published by Inhabit Media Inc, which draws on the experiences of her grandmother's childhood to examine the unique perspective of living in the Arctic at. time when traditional Inuit values began to mix with outside influences and objects. Each volume in the series examines the feelings of anticipation, excitement, loss, and resilience experienced by Inuit as their world began to change through the introduction of outside influences. Seen through the eyes of one little girl as she navigates life in her camp with her family, this series gives young readers a window into a unique time in Arctic history.  

 Una Huna?: What Is This? (2018)
 Una Huna?: Ukpik Learns to Sew (2022)

See also 

Music of Canada
Aboriginal music of Canada
Notable Aboriginal people of Canada
List of Canadian musicians

References
Citations

External links 
 Susan Aglukark Official site
 Canadian Pop Music Encyclopedia's entry

1967 births
Living people
People from Churchill, Manitoba
People from Arviat
Officers of the Order of Canada
Inuit musicians
Canadian women country singers
Canadian country singer-songwriters
Canadian women singer-songwriters
Canadian folk singer-songwriters
Canadian Inuit women
Musicians from Nunavut
Canadian women pop singers
Indspire Awards
Canadian Country Music Association Rising Star Award winners
Juno Award for Indigenous Music Album of the Year winners
Juno Award for Breakthrough Artist of the Year winners
20th-century Canadian women singers
21st-century Canadian women singers
Inuit from the Northwest Territories
Inuit from Nunavut
Musicians from Manitoba